In music, Op. 139 stands for Opus number 139. Compositions that are assigned this number include:

 Czerny – 100 Progressive Studies
 Schumann – "Des Sängers Fluch" (Uhland) for solo voice, chorus and orchestra
 Shostakovich – March of the Soviet Police
 Smirnov – Triple Concerto No. 2
 Strauss II – Kron